Einar Rasmussen (born 16 July 1956) is a Norwegian sprint canoeist who competed from the mid-1970s to the late 1980s. He won ten medals at the ICF Canoe Sprint World Championships with four golds (K-1 10000 m: 1981, 1983; K-2 1000 m: 1979, K-4 10000 m: 1975), three silvers (K-1 10000 m: 1979, 1982; K-2 1000 m: 1978), and three bronzes (K-1 1000 m: 1981, 1982; K-1 10000 m: 1987).

Rasmussen also competed in three Summer Olympics, earning his best finish of sixth in the K-4 1000 m event at Montreal in 1976.

He has his education from the Norwegian School of Sport Sciences.

References

External links
 
 

1956 births
Living people
Canoeists at the 1976 Summer Olympics
Canoeists at the 1984 Summer Olympics
Canoeists at the 1988 Summer Olympics
Norwegian male canoeists
Olympic canoeists of Norway
Norwegian School of Sport Sciences alumni
ICF Canoe Sprint World Championships medalists in kayak